The 2005 Men's World Team Squash Championships is the men's edition of the 2005 World Team Squash Championships organized by the World Squash Federation,  which serves as the world team championship for squash players. The event were held in Islamabad, Pakistan and took place from December 8 to December 14, 2005. The tournament was organized by the World Squash Federation and the Pakistan Squash Federation. The England team won his third World Team Championships beating the Egyptian team in the final.

Participating teams
A total of 22 teams competed from all the five confederations: Africa, America, Asia, Europe and Oceania. For Iran, it was their first participation at a world team championship.

Seeds

Squads

  England
 James Willstrop
 Lee Beachill
 Peter Nicol
 Nick Matthew

  South Africa
 Rodney Durbach
 Michael Toothill
 Rowan Smith
 Clinton Leeuw

  Kuwait
 Abdullah Al Muzayen
 Bader Al-Hussaini
 Nasser Al Ramezi
 Mohammed Hajeyah

  Austria
 Aqeel Rehman
 Jakob Dirnberger
 Stefan Brauneis
 Andreas Freudensprung

  Egypt
 Amr Shabana
 Karim Darwish
 Mohammed Abbas
 Wael El Hindi

  New Zealand
 Kashif Shuja
 Callum O’Brien
 Campbell Grayson
 Martin Knight

  Germany
 Simon Rösner
 Stefan Leifels
 Simon Baker
 Patrick Gaessler

  Iran
 Mohammed Hossein Sanaee
 Majid Rohani
 Paya Ahmed Abadi
 Mohammad Hossein Jafari

  France
 Thierry Lincou
 Grégory Gaultier
 Renan Lavigne
 Jean-Michel Arcucci

  India
 Ritwik Bhattacharya
 Saurav Ghosal
 Siddharth Suchde
 Gaurav Nandrajog

  Ireland
 Liam Kenny
 Arthur Gaskin
 Neal Murphy
 Brian Byrne

  Australia
 Anthony Ricketts
 Joseph Kneipp
 Stewart Boswell
 Cameron Pilley

  Netherlands
 Laurens Jan Anjema
 Dylan Bennett
 Tom Hoevenaars
 Marc Reus

  Finland
 Olli Tuominen
 Matais Tuomi
 Erno Teitti
 Hameed Ahmed

  United States
 Preston Quick
 Julian Illingworth
 Chris Gordon
 Beau River

  Canada
 Jonathon Power
 Graham Ryding
 Shahier Razik
 Matthew Giuffre

  Wales
 Alex Gough
 David Evans
 Gavin Jones
 Ricky Davies

  Hong Kong
 Wong Wai Hang
 Dick Lau
 Roger Ngan
 Anson Kwong

  Malaysia
 Mohd Azlan Iskandar
 Ong Beng Hee
 Timothy Arnold
 Mohd Nafiizwan Adnan

  Pakistan
 Shahid Zaman
 Mansoor Zaman
 Farhan Mehboob
 Safeerullah Ullah Khan

  Scotland
 John White
 Harry Leitch
 Stuart Crawford
 Alan Clyne

  Spain
 Borja Golán
 David Vidal
 Iago Cornes
 Alejandro Garbi

Group stage results

Pool A

Pool B

Pool C

Pool D

Pool E

Pool F

Finals

Draw

Results

Quarter-finals

Semi-finals

Final

Post-tournament team ranking

See also 
World Team Squash Championships
World Squash Federation
2005 Men's World Open Squash Championship

References

External links 
World Team 2005 SquashTalk Website

W
World Squash Championships
Squash
Sport in Islamabad
Squash tournaments in Pakistan
International sports competitions hosted by Pakistan